Franciszek Malinowski may refer to:

Franciszek Malinowski (activist)  (1897–1944), Polish activist, communist and politician
Franciszek Malinowski (journalist) (1931–2014), Polish journalist, philologist and scholar